Ungmennafélag Njarðvíkur is an Icelandic multi-sports club based in Njarðvík, Reykjanesbær, on the south-west peninsula of Iceland. It is primarily known for its men's basketball team which has won the national championship 17 times. Its women's basketball team won the national championship and the basketball cup in 2012. The club also fields departments in football, swimming, power lifting, judo and triathlon.

Colours
The original uniform colours of the club where blue and white. In late 1973 the basketball department was in need of new uniforms and due to lack of funds they decided to select a colour that no other team was using, so they wouldn't have to buy two sets of uniforms. There where three colours to choose from but as the three selectors where all Boston Celtics fans they decided to choose green uniforms. The green colour has been in use since then, except for the 1989–90 season when the basketball department played in the orange colour of its biggest sponsor, Hagkaup.

Basketball

Men's basketball

As of the 2017–2018 season, Njarðvík's men's basketball team plays in the top-tier Úrvalsdeild karla.

Trophies and achievements
Icelandic champions: (17):
 1952, 1953, 1956, 1958, 1981, 1982, 1984, 1985, 1986, 1987, 1991, 1994, 1995, 1998, 2001, 2002, 2006
Icelandic Cup: (5):
 1987, 1988, 1989, 1990, 1992, 1999, 2002, 2005

Women's basketball

As of the 2017–2018 season, Njarðvík's women's basketball team plays in the top-tier Úrvalsdeild kvenna.

Trophies and achievements
Icelandic champions::
 2012
Icelandic Cup:
 2012

Football

Men's football

Njarðvík men's football team currently plays in the second-tier Inkasso league after winning the third-tier 2. deild karla in 2017.

Trophies and achievements
2. deild karla (Men's Second Division ): (2)
 1981
 2017
League Cup B (cup): (1)
 2003
 2012 (Runner up)
 2017 (Runner up)

References

External links
Official website

 
Association football clubs established in 1944
1944 establishments in Iceland